The Australian Federal Department of Health and Ageing was an Australian government department that existed between November 2001 and September 2013.

The department was created after the 2001 federal election from the Department of Health and Aged Care.

Scope
Information about the department's functions and/or government funding allocation could be found in the Administrative Arrangements Orders, the annual Portfolio Budget Statements, in the department's annual reports and on the department's website.

According to the Administrative Arrangements Order (AAO) made on 26 November 2001, the department dealt with:
Services for the aged, including carers
Public health and medical research 
Health promotion and disease prevention
Primary health care of Aboriginal and Torres Strait Islander people
Pharmaceutical benefits
Health benefits schemes
Specific health services, including human quarantine 
National drug abuse strategy
Regulation of quality of therapeutic goods
Notification and assessment of industrial chemicals
Gene technology regulation

Structure
The department was an Australian Public Service department, staffed by officials who were responsible to the Minister and assisting parliamentary secretary.

The secretary of the department was Jane Halton, appointed in January 2002.

References

Citations

Sources 

 
 
 
 

Ministries established in 2001
Health and Ageing
2001 establishments in Australia
2013 disestablishments in Australia